Gabriel Bengtsson (born 5 September 1977) is a Swedish judoka.

Achievements

References

1977 births
Living people
Swedish male judoka
Judoka at the 2000 Summer Olympics
Olympic judoka of Sweden
Place of birth missing (living people)